Shahrak-e Zu ol Faqari (also Romanized as Shahrak-e Z̄ū ol Faqārī; also known as Shahrak-e Z̄ū ol Faqār) is a village in Dasht-e Abbas Rural District, Musian District, Dehloran County, Ilam Province, Iran. At the 2006 census, its population was 982, in 133 families. The village is populated by Arabs.

References 

Populated places in Dehloran County
Arab settlements in llam Province